Numerius Negidius is a name used in Roman jurisprudence, based on a play on words: Numerius is a Roman praenomen, or forename, resembling the verb numero, "I pay"; while Negidius has the form of a gentile name formed from the verb nego, "I refuse".  Thus, Numerius Negidius is a personal name that can also be interpreted to mean "I refuse to pay".  For this reason, it was used to refer to the defendant in a hypothetical lawsuit.

The plaintiff would be referred to as Aulus Agerius. Aulus is also a praenomen, while Agerius suggests the Latin verb ago, "I set in motion", as it is the plaintiff who initiates a lawsuit.

One well-known legal formula, a model instruction to the judge in a civil lawsuit, began as follows: si paret Numerium Negidium Aulo Agerio sestertium decem milia dare oportere, meaning, "if it appears that Numerius Negidius ought to pay Aulus Agerius ten thousand sesterces..."  In actual use, the names and amounts would be changed to the appropriate values.

The initials N. N. can also stand for "name unknown" (nomen nescio), a placeholder name roughly equivalent to John or Jane Doe, Thomas Atkins, etc.

References

 Robinson, O. F., The Sources of Roman Law: Problems and Methods for Ancient Historians; Routledge, ; pp. 80, 89, (90 (restricted); as pub. at Google Books

Roman law
Placeholder names

de:Nomen nominandum#Begriffsursprung und -geschichte